, is a Buddhist temple located in the Higashiueno neighborhood of Taitō-ku, Tokyo, Japan. The temple belongs to the Jōdo-shū sect of Japanese Buddhism and its honzon is a statue of Hōnen.

History
Genkū-ji was established as a small chapel in 1590 in Yushima (currently part of Bunkyō, Tokyo), approximately where the Yushima Seido is now located. In 1604, Shogun Tokugawa Ieyasu made a grant of land to allow a proper temple to be established. In 1657, much of Edo burned down in the Great fire of Meireki, including Genkū-ji. The temple was rebuilt, but was moved to its present location as part of the Tokugawa shogunate's urban remodeling plan for Edo. Its urban location resulted in the destruction of the temple during fires in the Genroku era (1688-1704), Anei era (1772-1781), the 1923 Great Kantō earthquake and the Bombing of Tokyo (1945), but it was rebuilt each time. The temple's bonsho (bell) is dated 1636 and was a donation by Shogun Tokugawa Iemitsu.

The cemetery at Genku-ji contains the graves of a number of famous people:
Inō Tadataka (1745 - 1818), surveyor and cartographer. The grave was designated a National Historic Site in 1928.
Takahashi Yoshitoki (1764 - 1804), astronomer. The grave was designated a National Historic Site in 1928.
Tani Bunchō (1763 - 1841), artist
Banzuiin Chōbei (1622 - 1650), street tough

The temple is a two minute walk from Inaricho Station on the Tokyo Metro Ginza Line.

See also

 List of Historic Sites of Japan (Tōkyō)

References

External links
 Jodo-shu online dictionary 
Tokyo Cultural properties Database 

Buildings and structures completed in 1590
16th-century Buddhist temples
Buddhist temples in Tokyo
Historic Sites of Japan
Musashi Province
Pure Land temples
Buildings and structures in Taitō